The 1996 Montana Grizzlies football team represented the University of Montana in the 1996 NCAA Division I-AA football season. The Grizzlies were led by first-year head coach Mick Dennehy and played their home games on campus in Missoula at Washington–Grizzly Stadium.

Schedule

References

Montana
Montana Grizzlies football seasons
Big Sky Conference football champion seasons
Montana Grizzlies football